Halawa is a valley and ahupua'a (traditional land division) at the eastern end of the island of Molokai in Hawaii, United States.

The valley extends some 2 miles inland from the sea.

Halawa is the site of one of the earliest settlements in Hawaii.  The archeological features of the valley date back 1,350 years, the longest period of continuous Hawaiian cultural development.  The valley was extensively used for the production of taro, and at one time supported a population of several thousand.  Archeological remains include 17 heiau (temples), irrigation channels and ancient walls and terraces.

The traditional Hawaiian way of life continued in Halawa well into the 20th century.  The valley was flooded by the 1946 tsunami and again by the 1957 tsunami, which destroyed the taro fields.  The valley was then abandoned.  Only a few families now live in the valley.

Halawa lies at the end of Hawaii state highway 450, 28 miles east of Kaunakakai.  There is a public beach at Halawa, but most of the valley is private land.  Local guides offer hiking tours to the waterfalls.

References 

Populated places on Molokai
Valleys of Hawaii
Landforms of Molokai
Archaeological sites in Hawaii